Mexico competed at the 2012 Winter Youth Olympics in Innsbruck, Austria. The Mexican team was made up of one skeleton athlete and two officials. The chef de mission of the team was Carlos Pruneda.

Skeleton

Mexico qualified one boy in skeleton. Santander was born in the state of Utah.

Boy

See also
Mexico at the 2012 Summer Olympics

References

Nations at the 2012 Winter Youth Olympics
Oly
2012